ATN Punjabi Plus is a Canadian pay television channel owned by Asian Television Network. It broadcasts programming from India as well as Canadian content. Programming includes dramas, movies, music, news, spiritual programming and much more.

History

ATN Punjabi Plus originally launched on September 15, 2010 as ATN Punjjabi TV, as an exempt ethnic channel under the CRTC's Exempt Ethnic service policy.

On September 5, 2012, the channel was re-branded ATN GET Punjabi to reflect the change undertaken by GET Punjabi in India from which this Canadian service derives its programming.

In August 2014, the channel was renamed ATN Punjabi Plus, to reflect the loss of programming from GET Punjabi.

External links
 

Digital cable television networks in Canada
Punjabi-language television channels
Television channels and stations established in 2010
Punjabi-language television in Canada